Växjö lake is a lake in Växjö Municipality, Sweden.

Växjö
Lakes of Kronoberg County